Central Mangrove is a locality within the Central Coast region of New South Wales, Australia, about  north of Sydney. It is within the  local government area.

The town is situated at the crossroads of  Wisemans Ferry Road and George Downes Drive, and contains a primary school, a 9-hole golf course, country club and health centre.

References

Suburbs of the Central Coast (New South Wales)